The following is a list of ecoregions in Burundi, according to the Worldwide Fund for Nature (WWF).

Terrestrial ecoregions
By major habitat type:

Tropical and subtropical moist broadleaf forests

Albertine Rift montane forests

Tropical and subtropical grasslands, savannas, and shrublands

Central Zambezian miombo woodlands
Victoria Basin forest-savanna mosaic

Freshwater ecoregions
By bioregion:

Eastern and Coastal
Malagarasi-Moyowosi

Great Lakes
Lake Tanganyika
Lake Victoria Basin

 
Ecoregions
Burundi